Tom Beckert was an American sound engineer. He was nominated for two Academy Awards in the category Best Sound.

Selected filmography
 The Deep (1977)
 The Witches of Eastwick (1987)

References

External links

Year of birth missing
Possibly living people
American audio engineers